The Washington School for the Deaf (WSD) is a school for deaf children located in Vancouver, Washington, in the United States. The school educates children from all over Washington.

History
The Washington Territory Legislature of 1885-86 passed a bill to build the Washington School for Defective Youth. On February 3, 1886, Governor Watson C. Squire. the eleventh territorial governor signed the bill into law. The school was split to form the State School for the Blind and the State School for the Deaf in 1913.

Residency
WSD is also a residential school. It has cottages where students reside throughout the week. Students arrive on Sundays and depart on Fridays. Cottages are for students who live far enough not to be able to travel by bus every day to school. There are cottages for male and female students: Preschool, Elementary, Middle School, and High School. WSD's residential programs offers extracurricular activities, peer interaction, student growth and development, achievement, and more.

Athletics
High School Boys,
Eight-Man Football,
Basketball,
Track and Field,

High School Girls,
Volleyball,
Basketball,
& Track and Field

Middle School Boys
Soccer & Basketball

Middle School Girls
Soccer & Basketball

Elementary
Soccer

References

Schools for the deaf in the United States
Vancouver, Washington
Public boarding schools in the United States
Boarding schools in Washington (state)
Public elementary schools in Washington (state)
Public K-12 schools in the United States
Public high schools in Washington (state)
Public middle schools in Washington (state)